Derek Lynch (born 16 June 1971) is a Canadian race car driver from Warkworth, Ontario who races in the NASCAR Pinty's Series.

Racing career
Lynch began competing in the Busch North Series (now NASCAR K&N Pro Series East) in 1995. He raced in 16 of 22 events with a second-place finish at Beech Ridge Motor Speedway, pole positions at Holland International Speedway, Thompson Speedway and Beech Ridge, and a second Top 10 finish at Jennerstown Speedway to finish 16th in season points. Lynch returned to the East series in 1996 racing in two events. He had a single start in 2000 and recorded a ninth-place finish at Loudon. He worked as a fabricator for NASCAR NEXTEL Cup teams Darrell Waltrip Motorsports in 1997 and 1998, Dale Earnhardt, Inc. in 1999, and Stavola Brothers Racing in 2000. He returned to racing in 2001 and 2002 in the Ontario Super Late Model Series.

Lynch raced in selected events and promoted at Kawartha Speedway before beginning to race in the CASCAR Super Series in 2005. He competed in five of twelve events and had three Top 10 finishes at Toronto, Mosport, and Kawartha. Lynch returned to CASCAR in 2006, racing in five of eleven events. He had one Top 10 finish that season with a fifth-place finish at Kawartha.

CASCAR was purchased by NASCAR for the 2007 series and the series was renamed the NASCAR Canadian Tire Series. Lynch raced in all twelve races for the first time in his career and finished fifth in points with eight Top 10 finishes. He earned his first career Canadian Tire Series win at Cayuga Speedway Park on September 1, 2007. He was racing in third place in the final lap when Peter Gibbons and Jim Lapcevich spun while battling for the win. Lynch drove in all thirteen Canadian Tire Series races in 2008 in finished eleventh in points. He started the season with a fifth-place run at Cayuga, finished fourth at Barrie Speedway, and earned a season best third-place run at Cayuga's second race (Coke Zero 200). Lynch competed part-time in the Canadian Tires Series in 2009; he finished between eleventh and eighteenth at each event. He did not compete in a NASCAR series in 2010.

References

External links
 Official website, copy archived January 28, 2011
 

Racing drivers from Ontario
NASCAR drivers
Canadian racing drivers
People from Northumberland County, Ontario
Living people
1971 births